Kimberly M. Blaeser (born 1955) is a Native American poet and writer enrolled in the White Earth Band of the Minnesota Chippewa Tribe. She was the Wisconsin Poet Laureate 2015–16.

Background
Kimberly Blaeser was born in 1955 in Billings, Montana. Being of German and Anishinaabe Heritage, she grew up the White Earth reservation.

Career
Blaeser was named Wisconsin Poet Laureate for 2015–2016 on January 7, 2015, by the Wisconsin Poet Laureate Commission. She resides in rural Lyons Township, Wisconsin. Blaeser works as Professor of English at the University of Wisconsin–Milwaukee, where she teaches Creative Writing, Native American Literature, and American Nature Writing.

Her first book of poetry, Trailing You, was awarded the 1993 Diane Decorah First Book Award from the Native Writers' Circle of the Americas, and she was the first critic to publish a book-length study of the fiction of her fellow White Earth Ojibwe writer, Gerald Vizenor. Her work is widely anthologized and has been translated into several languages, including Spanish, Norwegian, Indonesian, and Anishinaabemowin. Blaeser has performed her poetry around the globe, having given readings of creative work at over two hundred different venues in a dozen different countries, including performances at the Borobudur Temple in Indonesia and in a Fire-Ceremony at the Borderlands Museum Grounds in arctic Norway.

Blaeser is active in service to literature, the arts, and social justice. She currently serves on the editorial board for the American Indian Lives series of the University of Nebraska Press, and for the Native American Series of Michigan State University Press. She has served on the advisory board for the Sequoyah Research Center and Native American Press Archives, on the Poetry Fellowship Panel for the National Endowment of the Arts, and has been a member of the Native American Alumni Board for the University of Notre Dame. Most recently, Blaeser initiated the Milwaukee Native American Literary Cooperative which helped to bring 75 Native American writers to Milwaukee for the 20th Anniversary Returning the Gift Festival of Native Writers and Storytellers in 2012 and continues to sponsor events each year.

Bibliography

Poetry
Apprenticed to Justice. Salt Publishing, 2007.
Trailing You. Greenfield Press, 1994 (First Book Award for Poetry, Native Writers' Circle of the Americas)
Absentee Indians and other Poems
Downwinders
Learning, At Last
This Cocoon
Two Haiku
Copper Yearning. Holy Cow! Press, 2019.

Literary criticism
"On Mapping and Urban Shamans", in As We Are Now: Mixblood Essays on Race and Identity, edited by William S. Penn. University of California Press, 1997
Gerald Vizenor: Writing in the Oral Tradition.  University of Oklahoma Press, 1996.

Edited collections
Stories Migrating Home.  Edited and introduced by Blaeser and including her short story "Fancy Dog Contest." Loonfeather Press, 1999.
"Like 'Reeds through the Ribs of a Basket': Native Women Weaving Stories", in Other Sisterhoods: Literary Theory and U.S. Women of Color, edited by Sandra Kumamoto Stanley.  University of Illinois, 1998.
Native American Literatures: An Encyclopedia of Works, Characters, Authors, and Themes. Kathy J. Whitson, 1999.

In Anthology
Ghost Fishing: An Eco-Justice Poetry Anthology, edited by Melissa Tuckey.  University of Georgia Press, 2018.
Thanku: Poems of Gratitude, edited by Miranda Paul, illustrated by Marlena Myles. Millbrook Press, 2019.

See also

 Official Wisconsin Poet Laureate site
 Official Kimberly Blaeser site
 Kim Blaeser from Voices in the Gaps
 Salt Publishing - photo, biography and excerpts of recent work

References

1955 births
Living people
Ojibwe people
Native American poets
University of Wisconsin–Milwaukee faculty
American people of German descent
American women poets
Writers from Billings, Montana
Poets from Montana
Poets Laureate of Wisconsin
20th-century American poets
20th-century American women writers
21st-century American poets
21st-century American women writers
Native American women writers
20th-century Native Americans
21st-century Native Americans
20th-century Native American women
21st-century Native American women
American women academics